Peter Menacher (born 29 November 1939 in Augsburg, Germany) was the mayor of Augsburg, Germany for twelve years between 1990 and 2002. He was a member of the Christian Social Union of Bavaria.

References

Mayors of Augsburg
1939 births
Living people